Stephanie Talbot (born 15 June 1994) is an Australian professional basketball player for the Los Angeles Sparks of the Women's National Basketball Association (WNBA).

Talbot was a member of the Australian Women's basketball team (Opals) at the 2020 Tokyo Olympics. The Opals were eliminated after losing to the USA in the quarterfinals.

Career

WNBL
Talbot began her career at just the age of 17, playing with the Adelaide Lightning for the 2011–12 WNBL season. In just her second season, Talbot was recognised as one of the brightest prospects in the Women's National Basketball League (WNBL), winning the 2013 Betty Watson Rookie of the Year award. In accepting her award, Talbot was asked what she had learned from playing with Olympians Suzy Batkovic, Laura Hodges and Jennifer Screen, and she replied "Shitloads".

In 2018, Talbot returned to the league after signing with the Melbourne Boomers. This was her first season back after spending two seasons overseas in Europe.

In 2019, it was announced Talbot would re-join the Adelaide Lightning, returning to both her home state and her first WNBL team.

In 2020, Talbot re-signed with the Adelaide Lightning for her second consecutive season.

WNBA
In 2014, Talbot nominated for the WNBA draft, where she was selected in the third round (33rd overall) by the Phoenix Mercury. Talbot opted to play for the Canberra Capitals for the WNBL 2014-15 season. In 2017, the Phoenix Mercury re-acquired Talbot.

In 2019, Talbot was traded to the Minnesota Lynx after two seasons with the Mercury. In the off-season, she was traded to the New York Liberty for draft pick Erica Ogwumike.

After electing to sit-out the 2020 season, Talbot's rights remained with the Liberty. In February 2021, the Liberty traded their negotiating rights to the Seattle Storm. Talbot would subsequently sign a training camp contract with the Storm.

National team

Youth Level
Talbot made her international debut for the Sapphires at the 2009 FIBA Under-16 Oceania Championship in Brisbane. Later in 2013, Talbot was a member of the bronze medal winning team at the World Championship held in Lithuania. At that tournament, Talbot was named to the World Championship All-Star Five.

Senior Level
Talbot is a current member of the Australian Women's basketball training squad. At official senior FIBA tournaments, Talbot has played for the Opals at the 2015 Oceania Women’s Championship, 2016 Olympic Games and 2018 World Cup.

Talbot, like all the other members of the 2020 Tokyo Olympics Opals women's basketball team, had a difficult tournament. The Opals lost their first two group stage matches. They looked flat against Belgium and then lost to China in heartbreaking circumstances. In their last group match the Opals needed to beat Puerto Rico by 25 or more in their final match to progress. This they did by 27 in a very exciting match. However, they lost to the United States in their quarterfinal 79 to 55.

Career statistics

WNBA

Regular season

|-
| align="left" | 2017
| align="left" | Phoenix
| 34 || 24 || 17.9  || .415 || .381 || .652 || 2.7 || 1.6 || 0.7 || 0.3 || 0.9 || 4.4
|-
| align="left" | 2018
| align="left" | Phoenix
| 31 || 8 || 14.6 || .464 || .386 || .905 || 1.9 || 1.3 || 0.4 || 0.3 || 0.9 || 3.7
|-
| align="left" | 2019
| align="left" | Minnesota
| 33 || 10 || 17.0 || .370 || .326 || .871 || 2.4 || 1.2 || 0.9 || 0.3 || 1.3 || 5.2
|-
| align="left" | 2021
| align="left" | Seattle
| 30 || 9 || 17.9 || .483 || .415 || .750 || 2.9 || 1.6 || 0.5 || 0.4 || 1.6 || 5.7
|-
| align="left" | 2022
| align="left" | Seattle
| 34 || 1 || 16.1 || .464 || .397 || .583 || 3.1 || 1.3 || 0.7 || 0.3 || 1.1 || 5.0
|-
| align="left" | Career
| align="left" | 5 years, 3 teams
| 162 || 52 || 16.7 || .436 || .376 || .738 || 2.6 || 1.4 || 0.7 || 0.3 || 1.1 || 4.8
|}

Postseason

|-
| align="left" | 2017
| align="left" | Phoenix
| 4 || 0 || 5.7 || .750 || .500 || 1.000 || 0.5 || 0.3 || 0.0 || 0.0 || 0.5 || 2.0
|-
| align="left" | 2018
| align="left" | Phoenix
| 4 || 4 || 27.1 || .474 || .333 || .600 || 5.3 || 2.8 || 1.0 || 0.0 || 2.2 || 6.3
|-
| align="left" | 2019
| align="left" | Minnesota
| 1 || 0 || 14.9 || .500 || .500 || – || 1.0 || 1.0 || 0.0 || 0.0 || 1.0 || 5.0
|-
| align="left" | 2021
| align="left" | Seattle
| 1 || 0 || 17.0 || .500 || .000 || .000 || 4.0 || 0.0 || 1.0 || 1.0 || 0.0 || 6.0
|-
| align="left" | 2022
| align="left" | Seattle
| 6 || 2 || 21.3 || .448 || .500 || .600 || 4.3 || 1.7 || 0.5 || 0.5 || 1.0 || 6.2
|-
| align="left" | Career
| align="left" | 5 years, 3 teams
| 16 || 6 || 18.2 || .484 || .412 || .583 || 3.4 || 1.4 || 0.5 || 0.3 || 1.1 || 5.1
|}

See also
List of Australian WNBA players
WNBL Rookie of the Year Award

References

External links

1994 births
Living people
Adelaide Lightning players
Australian expatriate basketball people in Poland
Australian expatriate basketball people in the United States
Australian women's basketball players
Basketball players at the 2016 Summer Olympics
Basketball players at the 2018 Commonwealth Games
Basketball players at the 2020 Summer Olympics
Canberra Capitals players
Commonwealth Games gold medallists for Australia
Commonwealth Games medallists in basketball
Forwards (basketball)
Minnesota Lynx players
Olympic basketball players of Australia
Phoenix Mercury draft picks
Phoenix Mercury players
Seattle Storm players
Sportswomen from the Northern Territory
Women's National Basketball League players
Medallists at the 2018 Commonwealth Games